Monkhouse is a surname. Notable people with the surname include:

Alan Monkhouse (1930–1992), English footballer
Allan Monkhouse (1858–1936), English playwright, critic, essayist and novelist
Amy Monkhouse (born 1979), lawn bowler
Andy Monkhouse (born 1980), English footballer
Bob Monkhouse, OBE (1928–2003), English entertainer
Graham Monkhouse (born 1954), former English cricketer
Michelle Monkhouse (1991–2011), Canadian fashion model
Steve Monkhouse (born 1962), former English cricketer
Victoria Monkhouse (1883–1970), English painter
William Cosmo Monkhouse (1840–1901), English poet and critic

See also
Monkhouse Davison (1713–1793), the senior partner in leading London grocers Davison Newman and Co
The Bob Monkhouse Hour, televised variety show in the 1950s fronted by the comedian Bob Monkhouse
The Bob Monkhouse Show, entertainment show presented by Bob Monkhouse
Monk's House